The 2016 Morocco Tennis Tour – Mohammedia was a professional tennis tournament played on clay courts. It was the third edition of the tournament which was part of the 2016 ATP Challenger Tour. It took place in Mohammedia, Morocco between 3 and 8 October 2016.

Singles main-draw entrants

Seeds

 1 Rankings are as of September 26, 2016.

Other entrants
The following players received wildcards into the singles main draw:
  Amine Ahouda
  Stefanos Tsitsipas
  Mehdi Jdi
  Yassine Idmbarek

The following player received entry into the singles main draw as a special exempt:
  Mikael Ymer

The following players received entry from the qualifying draw:
  Maxime Janvier
  Miljan Zekić
  Oriol Roca Batalla
  Oscar Otte

Champions

Singles

 Gerald Melzer def.  Stefanos Tsitsipas, 6–3, 3–6, 6–2.

Doubles

 Dino Marcan /  Antonio Šančić def.  Roman Jebavý /  Andrej Martin 7–6(7-4), 6–4.

References

Morocco Tennis Tour - Mohammedia
Morocco Tennis Tour – Mohammedia
2016 Morocco Tennis Tour